Hazrat Nizamuddin may refer to:

 Nizamuddin Auliya (1238–1325), Sufi saint of India
 Nizamuddin East, a neighbourhood in Delhi
 Nizamuddin West, a neighbourhood in Delhi
 Hazrat Nizamuddin railway station, a railway station in Delhi in the Nizamuddin locality